Parry Lodge is a historic motel-restaurant complex in Kanab, Utah. The main building was built in 1892 for  Justin Merrill Johnson, the son of Mormon settlers, who lived here with his wife Emma and their five daughters. Johnson built a barn, and a bungalow was built by Gideon Wilson Findlay, who was married to Mandana Farnsworth, a niece of the Johnsons, and lived here with their six daughters. In 1928, the main house was purchased by three brothers from Salt Lake City; Chauncey, Gronway, and Whit Parry, and more buildings were erected on the property in 1930 and 1931 as it was turned into a motel-restaurant complex. The buildings were designed in the American Craftsman and Victorian Eclectic styles. The complex has been listed on the National Register of Historic Places since August 14, 2003.

References

National Register of Historic Places in Kane County, Utah
Buildings and structures completed in 1930
1930 establishments in Utah